Autocharis putralis is a species of moth of the family Crambidae described by Pierre Viette in 1958. It is found in Madagascar.

It has a wingspan of about 15 mm and the length of the forewings is 7 mm.

References

Odontiinae
Moths described in 1958
Moths of Madagascar
Moths of Africa